Abruzzo is an Italian surname. Notable people with the surname include:

Jennifer Abruzzo, American labor lawyer and General Counsel of the National Labor Relations Board (NLRB)
Joseph Abruzzo (born 1980), American politician from Florida
Lynne Abruzzo, American scientist
Matthew T. Abruzzo (1889–1971), American judge
Michele Abruzzo (1904–1996), Italian actor
Ray Abruzzo (born 1954), American actor
Richard Abruzzo (1963–2010), American balloonist

See also
 D'Abruzzo

Italian-language surnames